Erling Flotve Myklebust (born 28 May 1996) is a Norwegian football striker who plays for Vard.

Growing up in Åkra IF, he played on the senior team from 2013. After two seasons he was picked up by larger neighbors FK Haugesund, and made his first-tier debut in August 2015 against Start. In the first half of 2016 he was loaned out to Stord IL, and in 2017 he was loaned out to SK Vard Haugesund, whom he joined permanently in 2018. The 2018 season was fruitless, but in the 2019 3. divisjon he managed 23 goals in 24 league games. Myklebust joined the Faroese club 07 Vestur before the 2021 season. After he had played 8 matches Myklebust returned to Vard Haugesund in May 2021. He moved up one tier to Åsane ahead of the 2022 season.

References

1996 births
Living people
People from Karmøy
Norwegian footballers
FK Haugesund players
Stord IL players
SK Vard Haugesund players
07 Vestur players
Åsane Fotball players
Eliteserien players
Norwegian Second Division players
Norwegian Third Division players
Norwegian Fourth Division players
Faroe Islands Premier League players
Norwegian expatriate footballers
Expatriate footballers in the Faroe Islands
Norwegian expatriate sportspeople in the Faroe Islands
Association football forwards
Sportspeople from Rogaland